Steve Kelly is an ice hockey player.

Steve Kelly may also refer to:
Steve Kelly (Emmerdale)
Steven Kelly (sport shooter), Canadian Olympic sports shooter

See also
Stephen Kelly (disambiguation)
Steven Kelly (born 1955), businessman and Olympic sailor
Steve Kelley (disambiguation)
Kelly (surname)